The 1980 Tirreno–Adriatico was the 15th edition of the Tirreno–Adriatico cycle race and was held from 8 March to 13 March 1980. The race started in Cerenova and finished in San Benedetto del Tronto. The race was won by Francesco Moser of the Sanson team.

General classification

References

1980
1980 in Italian sport
1980 Super Prestige Pernod